Megas 1972–2002 is a compilation released in 2002 by the Icelandic rock singer Megas to commemorate the 30th anniversary of his music career. This compilation, made up of 43 tracks, contains several of Megas's hits, from the first album titled Megas (1972) to Englaryk í Tímaglasi (2002).

The compilation features singer Björk as backing vocalist and the long-time collaborator, Guðlaugur Kristinn Óttarsson, who added guitars on several tracks.

Track listing

External links
Page about Megas at Tónlist.com - It features discography with mp3 samples.
Official site of Guðlaugur Kristinn Óttarsson
Page of G. K. Óttarsson at MySpace.com
Page of Þorsteinn Magnússon at MySpace.com

Megas albums
2002 compilation albums